Timea Bacsinszky and Mandy Minella were the defending champions, having won the previous edition in 2019, but chose not to participate.

Aliona Bolsova and Katarzyna Kawa won the title, defeating Ekaterine Gorgodze and Tereza Mihalíková in the final, 6–1, 4–6, [10–6].

Seeds

Draw

Draw

References

External Links
Main Draw

Bol Open - Doubles
2021 Doubles